The United States Federal Maritime Commission (FMC) is an independent federal agency based in Washington, D.C. that is responsible for the regulation of oceanborne international transportation of the U.S. It is chaired by Daniel B. Maffei.

History
The FMC was established as an independent regulatory agency by Reorganization Plan No. 7, effective August 12, 1961. Prior to that time, the United States Federal Maritime Board was responsible for both the regulation of ocean commerce and the promotion of the United States Merchant Marine. Under the reorganization plan, the shipping laws of the U.S. were separated into two categories, regulatory and promotional. The newly created FMC was charged with the administration of the regulatory provisions of the shipping laws, while the promotional role was vested in the Maritime Administration (now part of the U.S. Department of Transportation).

The passage of the Shipping Act of 1984 brought about a major deregulatory change in the regulatory regime facing shipping companies operating in the U.S. foreign commerce. The subsequent passage of the Ocean Shipping Reform Act of 1998, with its further deregulatory amendments and modifications to the Shipping Act of 1984, represented another pro-market shift in shipping regulation. The principle statutes or statutory provisions administered by the Commission are: the Shipping Act of 1984, the Foreign Shipping Practices Act of 1988, section 19 of the Merchant Marine Act, 1920, and Public Law 89-777.

Most of these statutes were amended by the Ocean Shipping Reform Act (OSRA) of 1998, which took effect on May 1, 1999.

Organization

Current commissioners 
List of commissioners:

 Chairman Daniel B. Maffei
 Commissioner Rebecca F. Dye
 Commissioner Louis E. Sola
 Commissioner Carl Bentzel
 Commissioner Max Vekich

Bureaus and offices 
List of bureaus and offices:

 Office of Equal Employment Opportunity
 Office of the Inspector General
 Office of the Administrative Law Judges
 Office of Consumer Affairs and Dispute Resolution Services
 Office of the General Counsel
 Office of The Secretary
 Office of the Managing Director
 Office of Budget and Finance
 Office of Human Resources
 Office of Information Technology
 Office of Management Services
 Bureau of Enforcement
 Bureau of Certification and Licensing
 Bureau of Trade Analysis
 Area Representatives

Regulations of the FMC 
Regulations of the FMC are found at 46 C.F.R. Chapter IV.

Regulations concerning Ocean Transport Intermediaries

Definitions 
The FMC regulations regulate the activities of Ocean Transport Intermediaries (OTIs) in the US. The FMC regulations define OTI to include two classes of logistics service providers: (1) ocean freight forwarders and (2) non-vessel operating common carriers (NVOCCs).

The FMC regulations define "ocean freight forwarder" as a person that (i) in the United States, dispatches shipments from the United States via a common carrier and books or otherwise arranges space for those shipments on behalf of shippers and (ii) processes the documentation or performs related activities incident to those shipments.

The FMC regulations define "NVOCC" as a common carrier that does not operate the vessels by which the ocean transportation is provided, and is a shipper in its relationship with an ocean common carrier.

Licensing requirements

OTIs must be licensed by the FMC before they perform OTI services in the United States. Requirements for licensing are found at 46 CFR §§ 515.11-515.27.

Duties 
The FMC regulations define duties with which OTIs must comply at 46 CFR §§ 515.31-515.34.

Fees and compensation 
The FMC regulations set out certain rules regarding fees that freight forwarders may charge to their customers and compensation that freight forwarders may receive from carriers at 46 CFR §§ 515.41-515.91.

List of former commissioners

Responsibility for U.S. merchant shipping has been held by different federal agencies since 1917. For a history, see United States Shipping Board.

References

External links
 
 Federal Maritime Commission in the Federal Register

Independent agencies of the United States government
Government agencies established in 1961
Maritime transport authorities
Organizations based in Washington, D.C.
Maritime
1961 establishments in the United States